The State Institute of Public Administration and Rural Development (SIPARD) is a training institute dedicated to public administration and rural development in Indian state of Tripura. The institute was established in the year 1993 by the Government of India. The name of the institute varies to Panchayati Raj Training Institute, Regional Survey Training Institute, Cooperative Training Institute and more in different states in India.

Programmes 
The institute provides training programmes to the State government officials, representatives of PRIs and to the various members of non-governmental organizations (NGOs).

References

External links
Official website

Public administration schools in India
Rural development organisations in India
Universities and colleges in Tripura
Education in Agartala
Educational institutions established in 1993
1993 establishments in Tripura